The 1951 Michigan State Normal Hurons football team represented Michigan State Normal College (later renamed Eastern Michigan University) in the Interstate Intercollegiate Athletic Conference (IIAC) during the 1951 college football season. In their third and final season under head coach Harry Ockerman, the Hurons compiled a 4–5 record (2–4 against IIAC opponents) and outscored their opponents, 186 to 183. Kenneth H. Wegner was the team captain. Vaskin Badalow, Nick Manych and Mike Orend were selected as first-team players on the All-IIAC team.

Schedule

References

Michigan State Normal
Eastern Michigan Eagles football seasons
Michigan State Normal Hurons football